St. Theresa's Catholic Church is a Roman Catholic church on Cartier Street in Ottawa, Ontario, Canada. The church is located in the eastern section of downtown Ottawa, on Somerset Street between Elgin Street and the Rideau Canal.

History
The parish was founded in 1929, split off from St. Patrick's parish, which had covered all of Centretown. The Romanesque Revival church building was completed in 1933 designed by noted Ottawa architects W.E. Noffke, Sylvester and Morin.

References

Exploring Ottawa: an architectural guide to the nation's capital. Harold Kalman and John Roaf. Toronto: University of Toronto Press, 1983.

Roman Catholic churches in Ottawa